Enigmapercis is a genus of bony fish which are part of the subfamily Hemerocoetinae of the duckbill family Percophidae. They have an Indo-Pacific distribution.

Species
There are two recognised species in the genus Enigmapercis:

 Enigmapercis acutirostris Parin, 1990
 Enigmapercis reducta Whitley, 1936 - broad sandfish

References

Percophidae